Pivot was an American digital cable and satellite television network owned by Participant Media. The channel, targeted at young adults between 18 and 34 years old, debuted on August 1, 2013. The channel ceased operations on October 31, 2016.

History 
In December 2012, Participant Media acquired Halogen TV and the Documentary Channel. On March 27, 2013, the launch of Pivot was announced, and was described as a "disruptive TV" service, focusing on social advocacy. The channel would take over the space held by the aforementioned channels, giving Pivot an initial subscriber base of about 40 million cable and satellite television homes. The channel launched on August 1 at 6 a.m. with a rendition of the song that launched MTV in 1981 (coincidentally, also on August 1), "Video Killed the Radio Star" by The Buggles, by several indie music artists, followed by a brief introduction to Pivot by Participant Media founder Jeffrey Skoll, and the first program, the 2010 documentary ReGeneration.

With the launch, Pivot became the first television channel to offer broadband-only subscriptions that allows live streaming of the linear channel and video on demand offerings without requiring a subscription to a pay television service. It was later announced that NeuLion had been selected to design and deliver the new cable network's downloadable interactive app which allows Pivot's content to be delivered to multiple digital devices. It offered its entertainment programming, live and on-demand, to authenticated pay TV subscribers and broadband-only subscribers.

Closure
On August 17, 2016, Participant Media announced that the channel would cease broadcasting by early 2017, citing low ratings, small viewing audiences, and an overall shift away from television by Participant under current CEO David Linde; the channel's last day of operation was later confirmed to be on October 31. The channel officially left the air at 6 a.m. EDT that morning; the last programs to air on the network were five consecutive airings of the film Good Night, and Good Luck from 8 p.m. on the 30th onward until the closure (the film choice was likely a nod to the final words spoken on Pivot's half-predecessor, Documentary Channel). No signoff message was given at the end (other than a commercial thanking viewers for watching and telling them what they watch does make a difference, having been run over the last few weeks of the channel's broadcast, being shown as a split screen during the film's end credits); rather, the channel merely faded to black after the end of the film, shortly after replaced with a slide from the cable services notifying viewers of the closure, after which the channel spaces, originally occupied by The Documentary Channel and Halogen TV from 2006 and 2009 respectively until 2013, both folded and ceased to exist.

Programming 
Programming seen on Pivot included original programs like HitRecord on TV, a variety show hosted by series co-creator Joseph Gordon-Levitt, and the reality-based talk show Raising McCain, hosted by blogger Meghan McCain.  Will, a period drama about a young William Shakespeare, was also announced when the channel launched, but was later put on hold. The show ultimately aired one season on TNT in 2017. Pivot was also the U.S. television home of the Australian comedy-drama Please Like Me, a show created and written by Josh Thomas, which had been co-produced by Pivot and the Australian Broadcasting Corporation for the second season.

Other shows include Jersey Strong, a docusoap that chronicles the lives of two families from parallel universes, the late night current events talk show TakePart Live, and the anime series, C-Control, which premiered on October 5, 2013. It was Pivot's only anime program, but not the show's North American television debut; the series originally made its debut on the Funimation Channel in January 2013. On January 29, 2015, Pivot premiered the UK series, Fortitude, on the same date as Sky Atlantic.

In 2014, Pivot launched Human Resources, a reality TV series providing a behind-the-scenes and at times humorous look at day-to-day operations at TerraCycle headquarters.

Other programs seen on the channel included acquired shows such as Buffy the Vampire Slayer, Farscape, Friday Night Lights, Little Mosque on the Prairie, The Operatives, Veronica Mars, and live programs and documentaries produced in partnership with Rolling Stone and Noticias Univision.

References 

Defunct television networks in the United States
Television channels and stations established in 2013
Television channels and stations disestablished in 2016
2013 establishments in the United States
2016 disestablishments in the United States